The 2018–19 Drexel Dragons women's basketball team represents Drexel University during the 2018–19 NCAA Division I women's basketball season. The Dragons, led by sixteenth-year head coach Denise Dillon, play their home games at the Daskalakis Athletic Center in Philadelphia, Pennsylvania as members of the Colonial Athletic Association. They finished the season 24–9, 14–4 in CAA play to finish in second place. They advanced to the championship game of the CAA women's tournament where they lost to Towson. They received an at-large bid to the Women's National Invitational Tournament where they lost in the first round to Harvard.

Previous season

The Dragons finished the 2017–18 season 27–8,  16–2 in CAA play to finish in a tie for 1st place. They lost to Elon in the CAA tournament.

Offseason

Departures

2018 recruiting class

Roster

Schedule and results

|-
!colspan=12 style=| Exhibition
|-

|-
!colspan=12 style=| Non-conference regular season
|-

|-
!colspan=12 style=| CAA regular season
|-

|-
!colspan=12 style=| CAA Tournament
|-

|-
!colspan=12 style=| WNIT

See also
 2018–19 Drexel Dragons men's basketball team

References

Drexel Dragons women's basketball seasons
Drexel
Drexel
Drexel
Drexel